David Allen Bawden (September 22, 1959 – August 2, 2022), who took the name Pope Michael, was an American citizen and a conclavist claimant to the papacy. Bawden believed that the Catholic Church had apostatized from the Catholic faith since Vatican II, and that there had been no legitimate popes elected since the death of Pope Pius XII in 1958. In 1990 he was elected pope by a group of six laypeople, including himself and his parents. In 2011, he was ordained a priest and consecrated a bishop by an Independent Catholic bishop.

Early life and education 

Bawden was born in 1959 in Oklahoma City, Oklahoma, to Clara ( Barton) and Kennett Bawden. He attended elementary school and high school in Oklahoma City. He had one brother. 

Bawden's parents were traditionalist Catholics who rejected Vatican II. In the mid-1970s, he and his family became followers of the Society of St. Pius X (SSPX). Bawden entered the SSPX seminary in Écône, Switzerland, in 1977, then transferred to Saint Joseph's Priory in Armada, Michigan. He was dismissed in 1978. His family subsequently moved to St. Marys, Kansas, where the SSPX ran Saint Mary's Academy and College. Bawden worked for the school and his brother attended it. In 1981 Bawden broke with the SSPX. Prior to claiming the papacy, he worked as a real estate agent and furniture maker.

Claim to the papacy 

Bawden believed that all the popes since the death of Pope Pius XII on October 9, 1958, were modernists, heretics, and apostates, and that their elections were invalid. He considered them to have incurred latae sententiae (automatic) excommunication for violating not only Pope Pius X's laws on modernism but also the divine laws.

On July 16, 1990, Bawden, his parents, and three other former adherents of the SSPX held a papal conclave at the Bawden family's thrift store in Belvue, Kansas. Bawden, then aged 30, was elected pope. He styled himself "Michael I" after Saint Michael the Archangel. Bawden had invited hundreds of Independent Catholic bishops and sedevacantists to the election, but none attended. As Bawden was not ordained until 2011, he was unable to celebrate Mass or confect the sacraments as a priest.

Later years and death

After the election, Bawden continued living at home with his parents. In 1993 they relocated to Delia, Kansas. His father died in 1995. Bawden established a presence on the internet as an alternative claimant to the papacy; in 2009 he stated that he had approximately 30 "solid followers". He supported himself through donations and by republishing out-of-print religious literature. In 2010, the independent filmmaker Adam Fairholm released a feature-length documentary about him, Pope Michael.

Bawden announced that he had been ordained a priest and then consecrated a bishop on December 11, 2011, by an Independent Catholic episcopus vagans, Bishop Robert Biarnesen of the Duarte-Costa and Old Catholic episcopal lineages. Bawden said that he was able to validly confect Catholic sacraments, offer the Mass, ordain other men to the priesthood, and consecrate them as bishops, since he believed that the Duarte-Costa and Old Catholic lineages were recognized as valid by the Catholic Church.

Rogelio Martinez, a Filipino archbishop in the Catholic Charismatic Church, united himself with Bawden in 2020. In a 2022 interview released posthumously, Bawden said that his church had grown to more than 100 members.

On July 10, 2022, his church's Twitter account posted that Bawden had to have emergency surgery and was in a coma. Bawden died on August 2, 2022, in Kansas City, Missouri.

References

External links
 Official website
 
 Pope Michael Interview with Pontifacts Podcast

Further reading 
 "Pope Michael", article by Magnus Lundberg for the World Religions and Spirituality Project

1959 births
2022 deaths
20th-century antipopes
21st-century antipopes
Clergy from Oklahoma City
Founders of new religious movements
People from Jackson County, Kansas
Antipopes
People expelled from the Society of St. Pius X
American traditionalist Catholics
Sedevacantists
History of Catholicism in the United States